Tinagma giganteum is a moth in the Douglasiidae family. It is found in North America, where it has been recorded from Alberta and Montana. The habitat consists of dry meadows.

The wingspan is 14–15 mm. The scales of the ground colour of the forewings are pale grey at their bases, shading into white and followed by a black tip. There is a broad blackish transverse fascia just before the middle of the wing, margined with white on the outer edge. There is a marginal row of nearly black scales. The hindwings are dark grey.

References

Moths described in 1921
Douglasiidae